Achuni (also Romanized as Achūnī; also known as Āchānī) is a village in Mahyar Rural District, in the Central District of Qaen County, South Khorasan Province, Iran. At the 2006 census, its population was 63, in 19 families.

References 

Populated places in Qaen County